Regional Rural Banks (RRBs) are government owned scheduled commercial banks of India that operate at regional level in different states of India. These banks are under the ownership of Ministry of Finance, Government of India. They were created to serve rural areas with basic banking and financial services. However, RRBs also have urban branches.

The area of operation is limited to the area notified by the government of India covering, and it covers one or more districts in the State. RRBs perform various functions such as providing banking facilities to rural and semi-urban areas, carrying out government operations like disbursement of wages of MGNREGA workers and distribution of pensions, providing para-banking facilities like locker facilities, debit and credit cards, mobile banking, internet banking, and UPI services.

History 
Regional Rural Banks were established under the provisions of an ordinance passed on 26 September 1975 and the RRB Act 1976 to provide sufficient banking and credit facility for agriculture and other rural sectors. As a result, five RRBs were set up on 2 October 1975 on the recommendations of the Narsimhan Committee on Rural Credit, during the tenure of Indira Gandhi's government. The purpose was to include rural areas into the economic mainstream since around 70% of the Indian population was rural.

Prathama Bank, with head office in Moradabad, Uttar Pradesh was the first RRB. It was sponsored by Syndicate Bank and had an authorised capital of Rs. 5 crore. The other four RRBs were Gaur Gramin Bank (sponsored by UCO Bank), Gorakhpur Kshetriya Gramin Bank (sponsored by State Bank of India), Haryana Kshetriya Gramin Bank (sponsored by Punjab National Bank), and Jaipur-Nagaur Anchalik Gramin Bank (sponsored by UCO Bank).

The RRBs were owned by the central government, state government, and the sponsoring bank with 50%, 15%, and 35% shareholding respectively.

Recapitalization 
A review of the RRBs in August 2009 by the Union Finance Minister revealed that a large number of RRBs had a low Capital to Risk weighted Assets Ratio (CRAR). A committee was constituted in September 2009 under the chairmanship of K C Chakrabarty, the deputy governor of the Reserve Bank of India (RBI) to analyse the financials of the RRBs and suggest measures, including re-capitalisation to bring the CRAR of RRBs to at least 9% in a sustainable manner by 2012. The committee submitted its report in May 2010.

The committee recommended RRBs to have a CRAR of at least 7% on 31 March 2011 and at least 9% from 31 March 2012 onwards. The recapitalization requirement of Rs 2,200.00 crore for 40 of the 82 RRBs were to be released in two installments in 2010–11 and 2011–12. The remaining 42 RRBs will not require any capital and will be able to maintain CRAR of at least 9% as of 31 March 2012 and thereafter, on their own. A fund of ₹100 crore to be set up for training and capacity building of the RRB staff.

The Government of India approved the recapitalization of the RRBs to improve their CRAR in the following manner: 
 Share of central government, that is, ₹1,100 crore will be released as per provisions made by the Department of Expenditure in 2010-11 and 2011–12. However, release of the funds will be contingent on proportionate release of the state government and sponsor bank share.
 A capacity building fund with a corpus of ₹100 crore to be set up by central government with NABARD for training and capacity building of the RRB staff in the institution of NABARD and other reputed institutions. The functioning of the fund will be periodically reviewed by the central government. An action plan will be prepared by NABARD and sent to the government for approval.
 An additional amount of ₹700 crore was set up as a contingency fund to meet the requirement of the weak RRBs, particularly those in the north-eastern and the eastern region.

Organizational structure 
The organizational structure for RRB's varies from branch to branch and depends upon the nature and size of business done by the branch. The head office of an RRB normally had three to nine departments. The following is the decision making hierarchy of officials in a RRB.

 Board of Directors
 Chairman & Managing Director
 General Manager
 Assistant General Manager
 Regional Manager/Chief Manager
 Senior Manager
 Manager
 Officer
 Office Assistant
 Office Attendant

Amalgamation 

RRBs periodically go through a process of amalgamation. In January 2013, 25 RRBs were amalgamated into 10 RRBs, totaling 67 RRBs. In March 2016, there were 56 RRBs, covering 525 districts with a network of 14,494 branches. As of 1 April 2020, there are 43 RRBs in India.

Legal significance 
RRBs are recognized by the law and they have legal significance. The Regional Rural Banks Act, 1976 Act No. 21 Of 1976 [9 February 1976.] reads:

List of Regional Rural banks
There are 43 RRBs in since 1 April 2020.

Andhra Pradesh

Andhra Pragathi Grameena Bank
Andhra Pradesh Grameena Vikas Bank
Chaitanya Godavari Gramin Bank
Saptagiri Gramin Bank

Arunachal Pradesh	
Arunachal Pradesh Rural Bank

Assam
Assam Gramin Vikash Bank

Bihar
 Dakshin Bihar  
  Gramin Bank
Uttar Bihar Gramin Bank

Chhattisgarh
Chhattisgarh Rajya Gramin Bank

Gujarat
Baroda Gujarat Gramin Bank
Saurashtra Gramin Bank

Haryana
Sarva Haryana Gramin Bank

Himachal Pradesh
Himachal Pradesh Gramin Bank

Jammu and Kashmir
J&K Grameen Bank
Ellaquai Dehati Bank

Jharkhand
Jharkhand Rajya Gramin Bank

Karnataka
Karnataka Gramin Bank
Karnataka Vikas Grameena Bank

Kerala
Kerala Gramin Bank

Madhya Pradesh
Madhyanchal Gramin Bank
Madhya Pradesh Gramin Bank

Maharashtra
Maharashtra Gramin Bank
Vidharbha Konkan Gramin Bank

Manipur
Manipur Rural Bank

Meghalaya
Meghalaya Rural Bank

Mizoram
Mizoram Rural Bank

Nagaland
Nagaland Rural Bank

Odisha	
Odisha Gramya Bank
Utkal Grameen Bank

Puducherry
Puduvai Bharathiar Grama Bank

Punjab	
Punjab Gramin Bank

Rajasthan	
Baroda Rajasthan Kshetriya Gramin Bank	
Rajasthan Marudhara Gramin Bank

Tamil Nadu
Tamil Nadu Grama Bank

Telangana
Telangana Grameena Bank

Tripura
Tripura Gramin Bank

Uttar Pradesh
Aryavart 
  Bank
Prathama UP  
  Gramin Bank
Baroda UP Bank
Uttarakhand
Uttarakhand Gramin Bank

West Bengal
Paschim Banga Gramin Bank	
Bangiya Gramin Vikash Bank
 Uttarbanga Kshetriya Gramin Bank

References

Types of business entity

Business organisations based in India
Financial services in India
Agricultural finance in India
Banks established in 1975